The 1940 United States Senate election in Wisconsin was held on November 5, 1940.

Incumbent Progressive U.S. Senator Robert La Follette Jr. was elected to a third term in office over Republican Fred H. Clausen and Democrat James E. Finnegan.

Progressive primary

Candidates
Robert M. La Follette Jr., incumbent Senator since 1925

Results

Republican primary

Candidates
 Walter B. Chilsen, former State Assemblyman (1919–21) and editor of the Merrill Daily Herald
 Fred H. Clausen, farming equipment manufacturer
 Michael G. Eberlein
 Glenn Frank, former President of the University of Wisconsin-Madison
 John P. Koehler, Health Commissioner of Milwaukee
 William C. Maas
 Reuben W. Peterson, former State Assemblyman (1937–39)

Campaign
Frank died two days before the primary, on September 15, but remained on the ballot.

Results

Democratic primary

Candidates
 William D. Carroll, former State Senator (1933–37)
 John Cudahy, former U.S. Ambassador to Poland, Luxembourg, Belgium, and the Irish Free State (write-in) 
 James E. Finnegan, former Wisconsin Attorney General (1933–37)
 James J. Kerwin

Results

General election

Candidates
 Fred H. Clausen, farming equipment manufacturer (Republican)
 James E. Finnegan, former Wisconsin Attorney General (Democratic)
 Ted Furman (Communist)
 Robert M. La Follette Jr., incumbent Senator since 1925 (Progressive)
 Adolf Wiggert (Socialist Labor)

Results

See also 
 1940 United States Senate elections

References 

1940
Wisconsin
United States Senate